Near Pak Ou  (mouth of the Ou river) the Tham Ting (lower cave) and the Tham Theung (upper cave) are caves overlooking the Mekong River, 25 km to the north of Luang Prabang, Laos. They are a group of two caves on the west side of the Mekong river, about two hours upstream from the centre of Luang Prabang, and are frequently visited by tourists. 

The caves are noted for their miniature Buddha sculptures. Hundreds of very small and mostly damaged wooden Buddhist figures are laid out over the wall shelves. They take many different positions, including meditation, teaching, walking, naga, peace, rain, and reclining (Nibbana).

Further reading

External links

Pak Ou Caves: Photo and Travel Guide

Buddhist caves in Laos
Geography of Luang Prabang province
Mekong River
Show caves
Tourist attractions in Laos